The St George Hospital and Community Health Service is a district general hospital, It is tertiary referral hospital is located in Kogarah, a southern suburb of Sydney, New South Wales, Australia.  It is part of the South East Sydney Local Health District and is an accredited principal teaching Hospital of the University of New South Wales.

Overview

As a major tertiary and teaching hospital, St George accepts patients from other parts of Sydney, NSW and beyond. It primarily serves about 250,000 residents of southern Sydney, in the St George area bounded by Botany Bay, Cooks River in the north, Georges River in the south and Salt Pan Creek in the west. Approximately 35% of the St George area's residents are from a non-English speaking background. The hospital is also the nearest provider of specialist medical services for around 200,000 residents of the Sutherland Shire.

The hospital has a designated medical trauma service and is the Medical Retrieval Service Coordination Centre for NSW. The hospital's departments include anaesthesia, critical care, surgery, cancer care, medicine, women's and children's health, mental health, community health and medical imaging.

In the 2002-2003 financial year there were more than 45,000 admissions (including day-only), and more than 723,000 outpatient treatments were administered. The hospital has approximately 600 beds and more than 2500 staff (full-time equivalents) and is one of the largest in Sydney.

History

St George Hospital began operation in November 1894, as a cottage hospital. It became a district hospital in 1924 and began performing surgery. By 1934, it was equivalent to any other district hospital in metropolitan Sydney. In 1964, it became a teaching hospital with specialised departments and became known as The St George Hospital. In the late 1980s it underwent a A$200 million redevelopment into a tertiary teaching hospital, providing the people of southern Sydney with specialist healthcare services closer to home. In 1998, there was an unsuccessful attempt by the NSW government to transfer St Vincents Hospital from its site in Darlinghurst to the St George Hospital site. The plan was abandoned due to community opposition to the loss of the St George name, and uncertainties about the future of the obstetrics and gynaecology service under the St Vincents Catholic Church- run administration. In 2014 the hospital celebrated its 120th birthday.

St George Hospital School
The Department of Education and Training operates a school within the hospital, known as St George Hospital School. The school is operated as part of the Botany Bay Network of schools within the Sydney Region.

In terms of facilities, the school uses a single classroom to deliver teaching, but less formal teaching does occur elsewhere according to the needs of the students.

RPA Hospital School provides for the educational needs of school-age children and teenagers while they are short term or long term patients at the hospital. In 2009, there were 703 students enrolled in the school at various times during the year, with the majority of those students staying for less than 3 days. All grades are provided for, from Kindergarten to Year 12, according to the syllabi produced by the Board of Studies. Students undertake exams, just as they would at their home schools, including the NAPLAN testing, School Certificate and Higher School Certificate. The school works closely with the Child and Adolescent Mental Health Service at the hospital in supporting the transition of students to the school and to the hospital.

See also
 List of hospitals
List of hospitals in Australia

References

External links

St George Hospital's Official website

Hospitals in Sydney
Teaching hospitals in Australia
Hospitals established in 1894
Cottage hospitals
1894 establishments in Australia
Kogarah, New South Wales
Hospital